Chillingham can refer to:

 Chillingham (game), a computer game designed for the visually impaired
 Chillingham, New South Wales, a village in New South Wales, Australia 
 Chillingham, Northumberland, a village in Northumberland in the north of England
 Chillingham Castle, an ancient castle in Northumberland, England, near Chillingham
 Chillingham cattle, a herd of rare cattle which have lived for centuries in the grounds of Chillingham Castle, in Northumberland, England
 Chillingham Road Metro station, a metro station in Newcastle upon Tyne, England
 , a minesweeper of the British Royal Navy